Héctor Sabatino Cardelli (30 August 1941 – 7 November 2022) was an Argentinian Roman Catholic prelate.

He was ordained to the priesthood in 1968. He served as auxiliary bishop of Rosario, titular bishop of Furnos Maior, later as bishop Concordia and San Nicolás de los Arroyos.

References

1941 births
2022 deaths
Argentine Roman Catholic bishops
Bishops appointed by Pope John Paul II